Haran (also, Kharan) is a village in the Lerik Rayon of Azerbaijan.  The village forms part of the municipality of Hamarmeşə.

References 

 

Populated places in Lerik District